Frank Millspaugh  may refer to:
 Frank C. Millspaugh (1872–1947), U.S. Representative from Missouri
 Frank Rosebrook Millspaugh (1848–1916), bishop of Kansas